This is a list of notable reggae festivals by country. 

This list may have some overlap with list of jam band music festivals. Reggae festivals may include classic reggae and related or derivative genres such as ska, dancehall, dub, hip hop, ragga, reggae fusion, and drum and bass. 

Reggae originated in Jamaica in the late 1960s, influenced by Rastafarian culture, Jamaican dance music, traditional mento and calypso music, as well as American jazz and rhythm and blues, and evolved out of the earlier genres ska and rocksteady. By the 1970s, large festivals in Jamaica were being held featuring notable reggae bands, and the Wonder Dream Concert in 1975 in Jamaica was one of the first internationally noted festivals to focus on reggae. In 1979, Reggae Geel became the first reggae festival in Europe, and these concerts soon spread to other locales, becoming popular in regions such as Northern California. With the introduction of the electronic reggae genre ragga in the 1980s, reggae began to be featured at electronic music festivals as well.

Festivals by region

Africa

Gambia West Africa
Gambia Cultural Reggae Festival The Hamlet, Gunjur, Medina Salam

South Africa
Reggae Ark Festival, Mamelodi, Pretoria

Mauritius
Festival Reggae Donn Sa

Nigerian
Roaring thunder concert

Kenya
Shashamane International 
Sepetuka
Reggae In the Sun
Royal Reggae Fest

Mozambique
Maputo Reggae Slam

Uganda
Reggae on the Nile

North America

Antigua
Reggae in the Park, Nelson's Dockyard, English Harbour

Barbados
The Barbados Reggae Festival

Canada
Calgary International Reggae Festival, Calgary, Alberta
Montreal International Reggae Festival, Montreal, Quebec
Ottawa Reggae Festival, Ottawa
Victoria Ska Festival, Victoria, British Columbia

Mexico
Baja Beach Fest, Baja California, Mexico

United States
California Roots Music and Arts Festival, Monterey, California ("Cali Roots")
 Chicago Reggae Festival, Chicago, Illinois
 JazzReggae Festival @ UCLA, Los Angeles, California
 Midwest Reggae Festival, Nelson, Ohio
 Reggae on the River, Humboldt County, California
 Reggae Rising, Humboldt County, California
 Reggae Rise Up, Saint Petersburg, Florida, Las Vegas, Nevada and Baltimore, Maryland
 Reggae in the Rockies, Alpine, Wyoming

Oceania

Australia

East Coast Blues & Roots Music Festival, Byron Bay
Raggamuffin Music Festival, also held in New Zealand

New Zealand

One Love, Tauranga

South America

Paraguay
 Reggae Fest, Rakiura Complex, Luque

Brazil
 Maranhão Roots Reggae Festival, São luis, Maranhão

 República do Reggae. Salvador, Bahia

Asia

India
Goa SunSplash, Goa

Japan
Yokohama Reggae sai, Yokohama
Shibuya Reggae sai, Tokyo
HIGHEST MOUNTAIN, Osaka

Korea
Rise Again, Seoul

Philippines
Bob Marley Fest, Cebu
Boracay Reggae Festival,   Boracay
Fête de la Musique, Manila/international
Kadayawan Roots, Arts and Reggae Festival, Davao
Manila Reggae Summit, Manila
Puerto Galera Reggae Festival, Puerto Galera
SunSplash Pilipinas!, Manila

Sri Lanka
Rock meets Reggae, Colombo

Europe

Austria
Rise & Shine Festival, Falkenstein

Belgium
 Reggae Geel, Geel
 Dubyard, Landen
 Irie Vibes Roots Festival, Kortemark
 Bomboclat Festival, Zeebrugge

Bosnia and Herzegovina
 Una Riversplash, Bihać

Bulgaria
 Big Big Summer Reggae Party

Croatia
Seasplash, Pula

Cyprus
Reggae Sunjam

Czech Republic
GoodTown Reggae & Dub Festival
Mighty Sounds
Real Beat Festival
Urban Rapublic

Denmark
Silkeborg Reggae Festival,  Silkeborg

France
Garance Reggae Festival, Bagnols-Sur-Cèze
No Logo Festival
Reggae Sun Ska, Pauillac
Verjux Saone System, Verjux
Ida y vuelta - festival, Perpignan
LA FEE ESTIVAL - festival, Chatelneuf Jura

Germany
Afrika Karibik Festival, Aschaffenburg
Reggaejam, Bersenbrück
Ruhr Reggae Summer, Mülheim/Dortmund
Splash!
Summerjam, Cologne
Chiemsee Summer, Übersee/ Grabenstätt
Black Forest On Fire, Berghaupten

Italy

Lebanon
Kul=Cha Reggae Festival, Amsheet

Montenegro
MontenegroSun ReggaeFest, Petrovac, Budva

The Netherlands
Reggae Rotterdam Festival, Rotterdam
Reggae Lake Festival, Amsterdam
Reggae Sundance, Eersel
Two Sevens Splash, Amsterdam
Rastaplas, Zoetermeer

Poland
Afryka, Toruń
Bass Camp, Rudawka Rymanowska
Ostróda Reggae Festiwal, Ostróda
Reggae & Dub Festiwal, Bielawa
Reggaeland, Płock
Stolica Reggae Festiwal, Kluczbork
Winter Reggae, Silesia
Independent Dub Day, Wroclaw

Portugal
Musa Cascais, Lisbon
HIM Festival, Rapoula Do Coa

Serbia
Reggae Serbia Fest, Pančevo

Slovakia
Uprising, Bratislava

Slovenia
Overjam, Tolmin
Soča Reggae Riversplash

Spain
Rototom Sunsplash, Bénicassim
Reggaeboa Festival, Balboa
Lagata Regge Festival, Zaragoza
La Concha Reggae Festival, Cantabria
Nowa Reggae, Barcelona
IDG, Barcelona
Bless Festival, Galicia
Dub Yard Festival, Galicia

Sweden
Bob Marley minneskonsert, Skärblacka
Öland Roots, Öland
Uppsala Reggae Festival, Uppsala

Switzerland
Plein-les-Watts Festival, Geneva, GE
Pachamama Connexion Festival, Lancy, GE
Lakesplash, Twann, BE
Reeds Reggae Festival, Pfäffikon, ZH
Enter the Dancehall Festival, Rote Fabrik, ZH

Turkey
 Unite in Paradise Reggae Festival, Olympos

United Kingdom
 Notting Hill Carnival, London, England
 One Love Festival, Essex, England
 Positive Vibration, Liverpool, England
 Simmer Down Festival, Birmingham, England

Middle East

Israel
 Reggae In The Desert, Ramat HaNegev Regional Council

Gallery

See also

Related lists
List of electronic music festivals
List of jam band music festivals
List of jazz festivals
List of music festivals

Related categories
:Category:Jazz festivals
:Category:Music festivals
:Category:Reggae festivals
:Category:World music festivals

References

External links

 California Roots Festival Official website
 One Love Cali Reggae Fest Official website
 Reggae in the Desert Official website
 Dry Diggings Festival Official website
 Reggae Rise Up Official website
 Field of Haze Official website
 Northwest Roots Festival Official website
 Northwest Freedom Festival Official website
 Northwest World Reggae Festival Official website
 The Mayjah Rayjah Music Festival Official website
 Hangout Music Fest Official website
 California Roots The Carolina Sessions Official website
 Shoreline Jam Official Website
 Springfield, MO Reggae Fest Facebook Page
 Bass Camp Official website

Reggae
Reggae
Lists of religious music festivals